Daphne axillaris is a shrub, of the family Thymelaeaceae.  It is native to China, specifically Hainan.

Description
The shrub and grows from 2 to 5 meters tall. Its branches are pale yellowish-green, and turn grayish brown when it ages. It is often found in dense forests at around 600–900 meters in altitude.

References

axillaris